(or ) are Japanese lettering styles invented for advertising during the Edo period.

() characters have little "whiskers" on them. While this -esque script appears fluid and spontaneous, it follows a strict ruleset based on the Chinese-originating "7–5–3 pattern". The brushstrokes must appear as seven distinct bristle lines, with narrower passages requiring five, and three as the stroke terminates.

() literally means "cage letters". The characters are thick and square in shape. It is usually used in inverted form or sometimes as an outline.

() is a very heavy, rectangular style used for making seals.

A style specifically associated with kabuki.

(), or  style of lettering is used for sumo wrestling advertisements and programmes.

The name  literally means "letters for " — Japanese theater. Unlike other calligraphic styles,  allows and even encourages multiple brushstrokes in order to fill in the characters as much as possible.

References

External links
sci.lang.japan FAQ: Edomoji

CJK typefaces
Japanese calligraphy
Japanese writing system
Japanese words and phrases